Ruth Airport  (formerly Q95) is a public airport located seven miles (11 km) south of Ruth, serving Trinity County, California, USA. This general aviation airport covers 60 acres and has one runway.

References 

Served as air base for fire fighters during summer 2008.

External links 

Airports in Trinity County, California